Falling is a 2008 independent drama film written, directed and starring Richard Dutcher. The film was released on January 18, 2008.

Dubbed "The First R-rated Mormon Movie" during its brief theatrical run in 2008.

Cast 

 Richard Dutcher as Eric Boyle
 Virginia Reece as Davey Boyle
 Cesar Garcia as Ruiz
 Frank Uzzolino as Hector
 Maria Eberline as Lorena
 Tennison Hightower as Linda
 Hamilton Mitchell as Marc
 Leonard Kelly-Young as Marvin

Production

Filming 
The film was shot in Hollywood and Los Angeles. The film was financed by Richard Dutcher (who was be writer, director, co-producer, actor and co-editor) with a budget of $500,000.

Release 
The film was premiered in The Gateway Theater on January 18, 2008. The film also screened in Beverly Hills Music Hall on August 15, 2008.

Falling was later screened in Camelot Theaters (California) on 2009. The film was screened at Sundance Film Festival on 2011.

The film was officially re-released on April 27, 2012 in Broadway Centre Cinemas in Salt Lake City.

Reception

Critical response 

The Los Angeles Times said: "Falling is one of the best pictures of its kind in recent memory", and Dave Wolverton from The New York Times said: "Falling is one of the 5 most powerful films I have ever seen."

BoxOffice Magazine get to Falling four stars and said: "An important and indelible work ... impossible to forget.", and Wade Major said: "Dutcher has joined the ranks of the very best independent filmmaker in the world."

Nightcrawler lawsuit 
After the theatrical premiere of Nightcrawler, Richard Dutcher sued the director, claiming Nightcrawler is a rip-off of his film. Since the main character of the film Nightcrawler, as well in the film Falling, is a journalist who sells records of crimes and murders to various media, and the action of both films takes place in Los Angeles.

Dutcher's attorney Stephen Silverman stated that Nightcrawler has enough in common with Falling.

After three years, American judge Dee Benson agreed that the two films have some similarities.

On August 19, 2019, Benson eventually closed the case, saying that similar elements are a necessary ingredient for stringer-themed films and that the two films are too different to have any major copyright infringement.

References

External links 

2008 films
2008 independent films
2008 drama films
Lost drama films
Lost American films
American drama films
Films about murder
Films directed by Richard Dutcher
Films set in Los Angeles
Films shot in California
American independent films
2000s lost films